The East St. Louis Railers Track Club are a track team of East St Louis, Illinois They are known as the club which gave Jackie Joyner-Kersee her start.

References

Track and field in Illinois
East St. Louis, Illinois
Sports teams in Illinois